Ministry of Civil Aviation may refer to:
 Ministry of Civil Aviation (Egypt)
 Ministry of Civil Aviation (India)
 Ministry of Civil Aviation (Somaliland)
 Ministry of Civil Aviation (Sri Lanka)
 Ministry of Civil Aviation (Soviet Union)
 Ministry of Civil Aviation (United Kingdom)